The Lyons Housing Review was a UK public policy review on Housing initiated by the Labour Party Leader (and then Leader of Opposition) Ed Miliband.  Ed Miliband announced the creation of the Housing Commission at Labour Party Conference 2013 and appointed Sir Michael Lyons to lead.  Sir Michael Lyons reported on 16 October 2014, the full report is here.

Key Areas for focus 
Civic Voice in a call for contributions at the start of the commission summarised the initial parameters of the review thus

Sir Michael Lyons has identified a number of key areas on which he would like to focus:
 The land Market
 Investment in housing and infrastructure
 The role of a new generation of New Towns and Garden Cities
 Co-operation between adjoining local authorities in the planning process.
 Sharing the benefit of development with local communities.

Findings 
The executive summary gives the main findings
 The UK needs to build 243,000 homes a year due to household formation but builds 100,000 short of this.  The cumulative shortfall is set to increase to two million by 2020.
 The shortfall is caused firstly by a scarcity of land coming to market.
 and secondly by a decline in housebuilder firms particularly small and medium size enterprises (SME)
 and thirdly by a decline in public sector house-building, housing associations building on average 18,000 home per year whilst local authorities averaged 90,000 per year after WWII.
The executive summary then goes on to give a roadmap for action including 
 Elevate Ministerial Responsibility so that the Prime Minister and the Cabinet are held accountable
 Set ambition to build 200,000 homes a year
 Sub-targets to be set at the local authority level
 Establish a cross government departmental task force
 Legislation for Garden Cities, Compulsory Purchase Orders, land taxation
 The creation of New Homes Corporations and infrastructure funds
 Set targets for the release of surplus public land
 Promote transparency of the Land Registry to register not just ownership but also register options to buy land
 Legislation for a speeded-up planning process and new government powers to force local councils to produce and follow housebuilding plans
 Initial restriction of sale of houses to non local residents
 'Use it or lose it' to penalise land hoarding
 Cutting planning permission from 3 years to 2 years.

Reaction

Political Parties 
On publication the governing Conservative Party's Local Government secretary, Eric Pickles, said "The small print of Labour’s housing policies reveals they want to impose top-down planning, with unelected officials in Whitehall ripping up the Green Belt and dumping rebranded eco-towns on local communities." A charge denied by Roberta Blackman-Woods, Labour's then shadow planning minister.

The National Press 
The Conservative supporting The Daily Telegraph reported on the Green Belt proposals alone whilst The Guardian reported  Housing industry welcomes 180-page review calling for 200,000 new homes to be built each year.

Other Housing Reviews 
The Lyons Housing review is (as of 2017) the fourth UK Housing Review since 2004.    They are Barker 2004, Callcutt 2007, Lyons 2014, Redfern 2016.

References 

Housing
United Kingdom planning policy